This is a list of translators of one or more works of William Shakespeare into respective languages.

See also
List of translations of works by William Shakespeare

References

Shakespeare
 
Translators of Shakespeare